Emelia Hartford is a race car driver, custom car builder, television host, and actress. She is most known for building one of the world's fastest custom Corvette C8s and her performance car customization YouTube channel, which launched in 2017.

Background 
Before launching her YouTube channel, Hartford juggled small acting gigs between service industry jobs. As a hobby after her work shifts, she would work on customizing her cars and occasionally chronicled her progress with posts on Instagram. Her Instagram posts eventually led to tire manufacturer Michelin inviting her to New York to launch its performance summer tire, the Pilot Sport 4S. At the Michelin event, Hartford met other car-build influencers who advised her how to create videos. Afterward, she bought her first camera and started her YouTube channel. As of March 2021, her YouTube videos had more than 72 million views.

Corvette C8 Build 

"Phoenix", Hartford's custom Corvette C8, is one of the fastest C8s in the world and once held the record for quickest C8 in the quarter-mile. In June 2021, Hartford drove the car to a 9.36-second time with a trap speed of 147 mph at the Famoso Raceway in Southern California during a private testing event. This result surpassed her previous record of 9.41 seconds at 144 mph set in March 2021. This record was later surpassed by a custom C8 by FuelTech which finished the quarter-mile in 8.973 seconds at 160.92 mph.

Film, TV, and media 
Before starting her YouTube channel, Hartford took small acting roles in various films. She has continued acting and her most recent role was in the 2021 Netflix film A California Christmas: City Lights.

Hartford has also been a host or judge on numerous shows. She appeared on the second season of Netflix's reality TV show, Fastest Car, and was a judge on SEMA: Battle of the Builders. In June 2022, Motor Trend Group announced that Hartford would be one of the hosts of its new animated series, Super Turbo Story Time.

Hartford has appeared in media with major American automakers. In 2020, she co-starred with NBA player Devin Booker in a short film by Chevrolet for the release of the 2023 Corvette Z06. In June 2022, she appeared as a guest on the podcast of Jim Farley, CEO of Ford Motor Company.

References

External links 

Emelia Hartford on Instagram
Emelia Hartford on YouTube
Emelia Hartford on IMDB

Living people
American YouTubers
Year of birth missing (living people)
21st-century American women